Butterflies is a 2009 documentary film directed by Czech filmmaker Ester Brymova. The film won the Alan J. Bailey Excellence Award in Documentary Filmmaking at the Action on Film International Film Festival, Pasadena, California in the same year. Butterflies was the first feature-length film to explore the lives of viral video stars and one of the first indie films to be launched on YouTube for rental.

The film stars Olga, Fred, SxePhil, Charles Trippy, KevJumba, Kicesie, Paperlilies, KatiesOpinion, Daxflame, Joe Satriani, Esmée Denters, Michael Buckley, Dave Foley, Renetto, ClipCritics, Nigahiga, and Chad Hurley.

The full movie has been made available online on YouTube.

Soundtrack artists
Ondra Skoch (from Czech band Chinaski)
Freddy Mullins
Finotee
Luba Dvorak
Elena Siegman
Davedays
Josh Levine
Soulsearcher

References

External links
 
  reflex.cz
 Article on Butterflies Documentary by Microfilmmaker
 Article on Butterflies documentary by Documentarytech
 Butterflies (Full Documentary Film Video)

2009 films
American documentary films
2009 documentary films
Documentary films about the Internet
2000s English-language films
2000s American films